Citrus Park is an unincorporated census-designated place in Hillsborough County, Florida, United States. The population was 28,178 at the 2020 census, up from 24,252 at the 2010 census.

Geography
It is bordered to the north by Keystone, to the northeast by Northdale, to the east by Carrollwood, to the south by Town 'n' Country, and to the west by Westchase. Florida State Road 589 (Veterans Expressway) crosses the CDP from north to south.

Zip Code
The Citrus Park area uses the ZIP Code 33625. U.S. mail may be sent to Citrus Park with the city identified as Tampa or Carrollwood.

Schools
High schools (grades 9-12) serving Citrus Park are Sickles, Steinbrenner (public), Alonso (public), Citrus Park Christian School (private-Baptist) and Hope Christian School (private-Baptist).

Middle schools (grades 6-8) serving Citrus Park are Sgt. Smith (public), Walker (public), Tampa Day School (private), Citrus Park Christian School (private-Baptist) and Hope Christian School (private-boarding-Baptist).

Elementary schools (grades K-5) serving Citrus Park are Citrus Park (public), Northwest (public), Bellamy (public), Tampa Day School (private), Citrus Park Christian School (private-Baptist) and Hope Christian School (private-boarding-Baptist).

Demographics

As of the 2020 United States census, there were 28,178 people, 10,977 households, and 6,617 families residing in the CDP.

As of the census bureau's American Community Surveys of 2006-2008, there were 23,825 people, 9,085 households, and 6,243 families residing in the community. The racial makeup of the community was 82.6% White( 56.1% non-Hispanic white), 9.2% African American, 0.4% Native American, 1.4% Asian, less than 0.05% Pacific Islander, 4.8% from other races, and 1.6% from two or more races. Hispanics or Latinos were 31.3% of the population.

There were 9,085 households, out of which 33.4% had children under the age of 18 living with them, 48.3% were married couples living together, 16.2% had a female householder with no husband present, and 31.3% were non-families. 23.5% of all households were made up of individuals, and 6.3% had someone living alone who was 65 years of age or older.  The average household size was 2.62 and the average family size was 3.16.

In the community the population was spread out, with 26.8% under the age of 18, 6.8% from 18 to 24, 26.9% from 25 to 44, 29.5% from 45 to 64, and 9.3% who were 65 years of age or older.  The median age was 38 years. For every 100 females, there were 96.6 males.  For every 100 females age 18 and over, there were 93.5 males.

The median income for a household in the community was $54,732, and the median income for a family was $60,165. Males had a median income of $35,360 versus $29,739 for females. The per capita income for the community was $22,162.  About 4.7% of families and 6.3% of the population were below the poverty line, including 7.1% of those under age 18 and 13.7% of those age 65 or over.

Notable residents
, Citrus Park is the home of famous chimpanzee J. Fred Muggs, who lives in the care of Gerald Preis, son of trainer Carmine "Bud" Mennella.
Carole Baskin

Attractions
Big Cat Rescue is a non-profit sanctuary for large cats that is open to the public.  It is located off Citrus Park Drive near Gunn Highway and Veterans Expressway.
Westfield Citrus Park is a major shopping center opened in 1999.

References

Census-designated places in Hillsborough County, Florida
Census-designated places in Florida